The McDonnell Douglas (now Boeing) T-45 Goshawk is a highly modified version of the British BAE Systems Hawk land-based training jet aircraft. Manufactured by McDonnell Douglas (now Boeing) and British Aerospace (now BAE Systems), the T-45 is used by the United States Navy as an aircraft carrier-capable trainer.

Development

Background
The T-45 Goshawk has its origins in the mid-1970s, during which time the U.S. Navy formally commenced its search for a new jet trainer aircraft to serve as a single replacement for both its T-2 Buckeye and A-4 Skyhawk trainers. During 1978, the VTXTS advanced trainer program to meet this need was formally launched by the U.S. Navy. An Anglo-American team, comprising British aviation manufacturer British Aerospace (BAe) and American aircraft company McDonnell Douglas (MDC), decided to submit their proposal for a navalised version of BAe's land-based Hawk trainer. Other manufacturers also submitted bids, such as a rival team of French aircraft company Dassault Aviation, German manufacturer Dornier and American aerospace company Lockheed, who offered their Alpha Jet to fulfil the requirement.

The VTX-TS competition was not simply for the procurement of an aircraft in isolation; it comprised five core areas: the aircraft itself, capable flight simulators, matured academic training aids, integrated logistic support, and program management. For their proposal, MDC was the prime contractor and systems integrator, BAe functioned as the principal subcontractor and partner for the aircraft element, Rolls-Royce provided the Adour engine to power the aircraft, and Sperry is the principal subcontractor for the simulator system. During November 1981, the U.S. Navy announced that it had selected the Hawk as the winner of the VTX-TS competition. Reportedly, approximately 60 per cent of the work on the T-45 program was undertaken overseas in Britain. During September 1982, a Full Scale Engineering Development contract was awarded to the MDC team to fully develop and produce the proposed aircraft, which had been designated T-45 Goshawk. On 16 April 1988, the first T-45A Goshawk conducted its maiden flight.

Production

Work on the production of the Goshawk was divided between the two primary partner companies. BAE Systems (BAe's successor following its merger with Marconi Electronic Systems during 1999) was responsible for manufacturing the fuselage aft of the cockpit, along with the air inlets, and the vertical stabilizer of the T-45 at their Samlesbury facility, while the wings were produced at the company's plant at Brough, England. Boeing (which had merged with McDonnell Douglas during 1997) performed the manufacture of the remaining elements of the Goshawk, as well as conducting assembly of the type at a production line at St. Louis, Missouri, after having transferred work on the program from the company's facility in Long Beach, California.

The Goshawk retained the typical powerplant used by the Hawk, the Rolls-Royce Adour turbofan jet engine. During the mid-1990s, Rolls-Royce worked on establishing a US-based production line for the Adour engine, which was to be operated by the former Allison Engine Company (which had been recently acquired by Rolls-Royce in 1995); however, during September 1997, the U.S. Navy chose to terminate the partially-finished engine effort. Around this time, the U.S. Navy was greatly interested in potentially adopting another powerplant, the International Turbine Engine Company's F124 turbofan engine, for the Goshawk. On 7 October 1996, a T-45A test aircraft flew, powered by the rival F124 engine.

Early production aircraft were designated T-45A. From December 1997 onwards, later-built production Goshawks were constructed with enhanced avionics systems, which included the adoption of a glass cockpit and head-up display (HUD); as such, they were designated T-45C. From 2003 onwards, all of the extant T-45A trainer aircraft were eventually converted to the more modern T-45C configuration under the T-45 Required Avionics Modernization Program. This program brought the U.S. Navy's trainers to an identical Cockpit 21 standard, which incorporated both the HUD and the glass cockpit, which had the benefit of making the trainers more similar to the U.S. Navy's frontline fighter aircraft. On 16 March 2007, it was announced that the 200th Goshawk had been delivered to the U.S. Navy. During November 2009, the 221st aircraft, the final aircraft to be produced, was delivered.

Further development
During early 2008, it was announced by the US Navy that several of its T-45C Goshawks would be outfitted with a synthetic radar capability to allow them to support rear crew training requirements, and that it was considering a possible requirement for a follow-on order for such equipped models of the type. An initial batch of 19 T-45Cs equipped with this virtual mission training system (VMTS), which simulates the capabilities of the US Navy's Boeing F/A-18E/F Super Hornet's Raytheon APG-73 radar (including ground mapping, air-to-ground and air-to-air targeting modes, along with an electronic warfare training capability) were delivered to the Navy's Undergraduate Military Flight Officer training school at Pensacola, Florida. The type was used to prepare weapon system and electronic warfare operators for the Super Hornet and the Boeing EA-18G Growler.

Both McDonnell Douglas and Boeing have made multiple approaches to potential overseas customers, typically offering the Goshawk in the trainer role. During the mid-1990s, McDonnell Douglas teamed up with Rockwell International to jointly bid the T-45 as a replacement for the Royal Australian Air Force's jet trainer fleet in competition against, amongst others, the Hawk that the type had been derived from. Marketing efforts to acquire export customers were intensified following a cut in the procurement rate by the U.S. Navy during 2003; according to Lon Nordeen, T-45 business development manager, Israel had been identified as having a potential requirement for the type. During late 2006, the company promoted the concept of an advanced variant of the T-45C Goshawk to Greece, emphasising its close compatibility with the Beechcraft T-6A Texan II trainer already operated by the country. During early 2007, Boeing VP Mark Kronenberg stated that the company had held discussions with the Indian Navy, which had an anticipated requirement for naval training aircraft.

Starting in 2003, the Air Education and Training Command (AETC) of the United States Air Force (USAF) worked on the requirements for replacing the 1960s-era Northrop T-38 Talon jet trainer. By 2010, the US Navy was reportedly involved in the evaluations for the initiative, known as the T-X program and had been considering the merits of adopting the same airframe to meet its long-term requirements to eventually replace the Goshawk as well. Reportedly, BAE Systems, later in partnership with American defense company Northrop Grumman, has repeatedly held discussions with the USAF on the development of a new potential derivative of the Hawk conforming to their specific trainer needs, similar in fashion to the Goshawk for the US Navy.

Design
The T-45 Goshawk is a carrier-qualified version of the British Aerospace Hawk Mk.60. It was redesigned as a trainer for the United States Navy (USN) and United States Marine Corps (USMC). Changes were made to the Hawk in two stages. The Hawk was redesigned for carrier operations and submitted to the Navy for flight evaluation. The development flight trials resulted in further modifications. 

The initial redesign included stronger landing gear and airframe to withstand the loads imposed by catapult launches and high sink-rate (14 ft/sec) landings. A catapult tow bar attachment was added to the oleo strut of the new two-wheel nose gear .  Other additions were an arresting hook, an increased span tailplane, side-mounted airbrakes, and the addition of stabilator vanes, known as 'Side Mounted Upper Rear Fuselage Strakes' (SMURFS - USN), to stabilize flow over the stabilator with speed brakes extended.

Navy test pilots found deficiences which had to be corrected. Some required further external changes: a single ventral fin in front of the arrestor hook, a 6-inch (0.152 m) extension to the tail fin, squared-off wing tips and leading-edge slats.

At the time of the Goshawk's selection, the World War II-era USS Lexington was the U.S. Navy's training carrier. Lexington, which featured a 910 ft-long and 192 ft-wide angled flight deck, complete with a pair of relatively short-stroke steam catapults and similarly short, undamped arrester gear, was a major driving factor for the design of the T-45 in order to suit such operations. The aerodynamic changes of the aircraft, which were developed by BAe at their existing facilities in the United Kingdom, included improvements to the low-speed handling characteristics and a reduction in the approach speed. During flight testing of the Goshawk, it was revealed that the aircraft had retained relatively favourable flight characteristics, even when flown within stall conditions at the required low approach speed.

Operational history

The T-45 has been used for intermediate and advanced portions of the Navy/Marine Corps Student Naval Aviator strike pilot training program with Training Air Wing One at Naval Air Station Meridian, Mississippi, and Training Air Wing Two at Naval Air Station Kingsville, Texas.  The T-45 replaced the T-2C Buckeye intermediate jet trainer and the TA-4J Skyhawk II advanced jet trainer with an integrated training system that includes the T-45 Goshawk aircraft, operational and instrument flight simulators, academics, and training integration system support. In 2008, the T-45C also began operation in the advanced portion of Navy/Marine Corps Student Naval Flight Officer training track for strike aircraft with Training Air Wing Six at Naval Air Station Pensacola, Florida.  A small number of the aircraft is also operated by the Naval Air Systems Command at Naval Air Station Patuxent River, Maryland.

The original T-45A, which became operational in 1991, contained an analog cockpit design, while the newer T-45C, which was first delivered in December 1997, features a new digital "glass cockpit" design. All T-45A aircraft currently in operational use are upgraded to T-45C standard.  The T-45 is to remain in service until 2035 or later.

In 2017, the USN grounded the T-45 fleet for a three-day "safety pause" after more than 100 instructor pilots refused to fly the aircraft. The pilots cited concerns about incidents of hypoxia that they believed to have resulted from faulty onboard oxygen-generation systems.  Over the past five years physiological episodes linked to problems with the T-45's oxygen system have nearly quadrupled, according to testimony from senior naval aviators in April 2017. The grounding order was first extended, but then lifted to allow flights up to a ceiling of 10,000 feet where the Onboard Oxygen Generation System (OBOGS) would not be needed, and to allow instructors to conduct flights above 10,000 feet. The grounding order was fully lifted, along with all restrictions on flight ceiling and student pilots, in August 2017.  The T-45 fleet was thereafter upgraded with new sensors to monitor the onboard oxygen systems, as well as a new water separation system, in hopes of reducing hypoxia events and determining the root cause of the problems.  Though the underlying causes have yet to be definitively determined, by the first quarter of 2018, hypoxia events had returned to nominal levels after peaking in 2016 and 2017.  Work continues on ensuring further physiological events are kept to a minimum - backup oxygen systems are being developed and are planned to be installed by the second half of 2019.  In recent years, similar issues have also affected the Navy's F/A-18s and the Air Force's T-6s, F-22s, and F-35s, some within the same or similar time frames, and the Department of Defense has established a joint command to investigate the issue.

In October 2022, the aircraft were grounded following engine related issues.

Variants
T-45A
Two-seat basic and advanced jet trainer for the US Navy and US Marine Corps

T-45B
Proposed land-based version which would have been basically a conventional Hawk furnished with a US Navy-spec cockpit and no carrier capability. The US Navy had wanted to procure the T-45B so that trainee pilots could benefit from an earlier training capability, but abandoned the idea during 1984 in favor of less-costly updates to the TA-4J and T-2C.

T-45C
Improved T-45A, outfitted with a glass cockpit, inertial navigation, and other improvements. All existing T-45As have been upgraded to the T-45C standard.

T-45D
Tentative designation for an envisioned upgrade of the T-45, potentially incorporating various manufacturing improvements and additional equipment, such as helmet-mounted displays.

Operators

 United States Navy: T-45C

Accidents

As of August 2022, about 33 T-45 Goshawks have been destroyed in accidents, or about 15% of the inventory, at a rate of about 1 per year.

Specifications (T-45A)

See also

References

Citations

Bibliography

 Donald, David. Warplanes of the Fleet. AIRtime Publishing Inc, 2004. .
 Frawley, Gerard. The International Directory of Military Aircraft. Aerospace Publications Pty Ltd, 2002. .
 Gaines, Mike. "T-45 – Tailhook Trainer." Flight International, 12 March 1988. pp. 20–25.

External links

T-45 Goshawk US Navy fact file  and T-45 US Navy history page 
T-45 Goshawk page and T-45 Goshawk history page on Boeing.com
BAE Hawk at Greg Goebel's AIR VECTORS
T-45 Goshawk page on GlobalSecurity.org
Boeing/BAE SYSTEMS T-45 Goshawk page on Aeroflight.co.uk
T-45A/C Goshawk page on Naval-Technology.com
FAS Page on the T-45
Boeing Page on the T-45TS – the T-45 Training System
Aeroflight Boeing/BAE Systems T-45 Goshawk Aircraft Profile

Aircraft first flown in 1988
T-45 Goshawk
BAE Systems Hawk
Carrier-based aircraft
Low-wing aircraft
T-45 Goshawk
Single-engined jet aircraft
1980s United States military trainer aircraft